Dendrelaphis caudolineatus is a common species of colubrid snake known commonly as the striped bronzeback or bronze tree snake. It is erroneously called 'garter snake' in the Philippines. It is not venomous and it is the most commonly sold snake as a pet; however, they live longer in the wild.

Description
Dendrelaphis caudolineatus is a rather small and thin snake, it can reach a length of 180 centimeters but is usually closer to 140 cm.

The males are usually thinner than females but are more colorful, ranging from a reddish shade or bright chestnut brown, to a shiny bronze color. The females are usually dull-colored, and more stout-bodied than the males. It is also observed that females of this species tend to be less active than the males.

It is mostly arboreal but rarely climbs higher than 4 meters and is mostly found in the open ground or on grassy plains. It has been recorded in most habitats in its range, from coastal lowlands to mountainous areas up to 1500 in elevation. It feeds mainly on lizards and tree frogs.

Distribution
The snake is found in Southern Thailand, West Malaysia, Singapore, Indonesia (Sumatra, Java, Borneo), and the Philippines (Turtle Islands).

Subspecies
Dendrelaphis caudolineatus caudolineatus (Gray, 1834) is fairly widespread from Myanmar−Burma and Thailand to Malaysia, Brunei, Singapore, Sumatra, and into the Philippines.
Dendrelaphis caudolineatus flavescens (Gaulke, 1994) which was discovered in Tawi-Tawi Island, Sulu Archipelago.
Dendrelaphis caudolineatus luzonensis (Leviton, 1964) is found in Luzon, Philippines.
Dendrelaphis caudolineatus modestus (Boulenger, 1894) is found on the Maluku Islands and other regions of Indonesia.
Dendrelaphis caudolineatus terrificus (Peters, 1871) is found across northeast Sulawesi and into Mindanao. It is also found in the islands of Panay and Negros, Philippines.

References

Colubrids
Snakes of Southeast Asia
Reptiles of Indonesia
Reptiles of Malaysia
Reptiles of Myanmar
Reptiles of the Philippines
Reptiles of Singapore
Reptiles of Thailand
Reptiles of Vietnam
Fauna of Brunei
Fauna of the Maluku Islands
Fauna of Mindanao
Reptiles of Sulawesi
Fauna of Sulu
Fauna of Sumatra
Reptiles described in 1834
caudolineatus
Snakes of Vietnam
Snakes of Asia
Reptiles of Borneo